The 2022 Summit League women's soccer tournament was the postseason women's soccer tournament for the Summit League held on October 28–30 and November 5, 2022. The five match tournament took place at various campus sites. The six-team single-elimination tournament consisted of three rounds based on seeding from regular season conference play. The South Dakota State Jackrabbits were the defending champions, but was unable to defend their title after losing to eventual champion Omaha in the semifinal match. This was Omaha's first ever Summit League women's soccer tournament title, and they earned the Summit League's automatic berth to the 2022 NCAA Division I Women's Soccer Tournament.

Seeding
The top six of the ten teams competing during the regular season qualified for the 2022 tournament. Seeding is based on regular season conference records. Tiebreakers were used as needed. Oral Roberts was seeded higher then North Dakota State due to head-to-head tiebreaker. North Dakota received the sixth seed due to a head-to-head tiebreaker with South Dakota.

Bracket

Source:

Schedule

Schedule will include the quarterfinals and semifinals being played October 28–30 and the finals being played on November 5. The quarterfinal and semifinal rounds will be hosted by the top two seeds, the championship game will be hosted by the highest seed remaining.

Quarterfinals

Semifinals

Final

Statistics

Goalscorers

All-Tournament Team

Source:

References

Summit League Women's Soccer Tournament
2022 Summit League women's soccer season